Ali J. Eisner is a Canadian puppeteer, composer, director, photographer, creative producer and writer for children's television.

Eisner has created children's content and performed on programs for The Jim Henson Company, CBC Television, TVOntario, NBC Universal, YTV, PBS, FOX Entertainment, Nick Jr and the Disney Channel. They were the creator of Mamma Yamma for CBC Television, and were a director and supervising producer for The Sunny Side Up Show on PBS Kids Sprout.  Eisner played "Jay" the Blue Jay on "TVO Kids" for 16 years. Their main wheelhouse when puppeteering is to collaborate with Canadian musicians. They have also written, composed music and directed for children's television for the last 20 years.

Most recent works include puppeteering on Fraggle Rock: Back to the Rock and cast as a main character (Jae) on Supernatural Academy, airing on Peacock.

At the Juno Awards of 2019, Eisner's video for "No Depression" that they directed and puppeteered for the band Bahamas won the Juno Award for Video of the Year.

Ali is transgender and non-binary and uses "they/them" pronouns.

References

External links
 
 Website 

Canadian puppeteers
Living people
1973 births
Canadian music video directors
Juno Award for Video of the Year winners
Canadian LGBT artists
Non-binary artists
Transgender artists
LGBT puppeteers
21st-century Canadian LGBT people